ABA may refer to:

Businesses and organizations

Broadcasting 
 Alabama Broadcasters Association, United States 
 Asahi Broadcasting Aomori, Japanese television station
 Australian Broadcasting Authority

Education 
 Académie des Beaux-Arts (Kinshasa), Democratic Republic of the Congo
 American British Academy, Oman

Sports

Basketball 
 ABA League, Adriatic first-tier basketball league
 ABA League Second Division, Adriatic second-tier basketball league
 American Basketball Association, defunct professional league (1967–1976)
 American Basketball Association (2000–present), semi-professional league
 Australian Basketball Association, defunct semi-professional entity

Other sports 
 Amateur Boxing Association of England, former name of England Boxing
 American Bandy Association
 American Bicycle Association
 American Bridge Association

Trade and professional bodies 
 American Bankers Association
 American Bandmasters Association
 American Bar Association, an association of lawyers
 American Beverage Association, beverage industry lobby organization
 American Booksellers Association
 American Bus Association
 Antiquarian Booksellers Association, a trade body in the British Isles
 Association of Black Anthropologists
 Australian Banking Association

Other businesses and organizations
 AB Aerotransport, former Scandinavian airline
 ABA Chemicals, a Chinese chemical manufacturing company
 ABA Games, a Japanese creator of freeware games
 Alabama Baptist Association, United States 
 American Baptist Association, a Baptist denomination predominant in the American South
 American Bell Association International
 American Birding Association
 Australian Blue Asbestos, mining, bagging and blue asbestos distribution company
 Australian Breastfeeding Association

Finance 
 ABA routing transit number, a bank code used in the United States
 Accredited Business Accountant, American accountancy credential

Music 
 Altbachisches Archiv, collection of 17th-century music, most written by the Bach family
 A-B-A, the ternary form in music

Transport 
 ABA, the IATA code for Abakan International Airport, Khakassia, Russia
 ABA, the National Rail code for Aberdare railway station, Wales, UK

Other uses 
 ABA problem, a multithreading computing anomaly
 A.B.A, a character in the fighting game series Guilty Gear
 Abé language of Ivory Coast 
 Abscisic acid, a plant hormone
 Applied behavior analysis, a type of one-to-one behavioural therapy
 Architectural Barriers Act of 1968, act of the US Congress

See also 
 
 
 Abas (disambiguation)
 Abba (disambiguation)